Deepal Shaw is an Indian actress, singer and model who has worked in Bollywood movies. She was born in Mumbai on 22 Feb 1988.

Early life
Shaw attended St. Xavier's College, where she pursued a BA in Psychology.

Career

Career as a model
Shaw began her career as a model, taking part in the 2004 Miss India beauty pageant, advancing to the final round.

Film career
In December 2005, she finished filming on her second venture, Karma, Confessions and Holi, directed by Manish Gupta. The international, English-language film stars Sushmita Sen, Randeep Hooda, and Naomi Campbell, and released in 2009. The film received overwhelming negative reviews from critics.

Deepal Shaw is known for her character 'Annie' in movie 'Kalyug' in 2005, 'Melvyna' in movie 'Runway' in 2009, as 'Naina Roy' in movie 'A Wednesday' in 2008, as 'Suman' in movie 'Saheb Biwi Aur Gangster' in 2011. Recently in 2021, she featured in movie 'Murder at Teesri Manzil 302'.

Discography

Music and Music Videos

CD & Deepal Shaw

See also
 List of Indian film actresses

References

External links

 
 

Living people
Actresses in Hindi cinema
Indian film actresses
21st-century Indian actresses
Indian women pop singers
21st-century Indian women singers
21st-century Indian singers
Year of birth missing (living people)